The Russia national rugby sevens team competed in the World Rugby Sevens Series and the Rugby World Cup Sevens. After the 2022 Russian invasion of Ukraine, World Rugby and Rugby Europe suspended Russia from international and European continental rugby union competition. In addition, the Rugby Union of Russia was suspended from World Rugby and Rugby Europe.

Rugby World Cup Sevens
Russia has competed at the 2001, 2005 and 2013 Rugby World Cup Sevens. The team won the Plate final in 2001 to end 9th, with wins over Kenya, Spain and Georgia. In 2005 they finished 11th, collecting wins over Kenya, Uruguay and Japan. As hosts of the 2013 World Cup, Russia claimed the Bowl final to take 17th place, after beating Spain, Uruguay and Japan.

Sevens World Series 
The first appearance of Russia at the Sevens World Series was at the 2011 Hong Kong Sevens. The team lost to Wales, tied versus Fiji and defeated West Indies to reach Plate quarterfinals, where they lost to France to take 13th place. At the 2006 London Sevens, Russia defeated Canada, Tunisia and Australia to reach the Bowl final, where they lost to Portugal to finish 10th. The team resulted ninth at the 2007 Hong Kong Sevens, after defeating Italy, Korea, Kenya and France.

At the 2009 South Africa Sevens, Russia tied Australia and defeated Zimbabwe and the United States to reach the Cup final, where they were defeated by Wales to result 10th. At the 2010 South Africa Sevens, they defeated Kenya, Zimbabwe and France to reach the Cup final, where they lost to Scotland to end tenth. At the 2011 Hong Kong Sevens, Russia defeated Kenya and Malaysia to advance to Cup quarterfinals. After losing to England and Australia, the team resulted seventh. At the 2012 Scotland Sevens they won the Cup final to result ninth, after beating United States, France and Spain.

Russia played the 2013 Sevens World Series qualifier at Hong Kong. They defeated Cook Islands, Mexico and Zimbabwe to win they group. Later they defeated Uruguay but lost to Zimbabwe in the semifinals. In the 2014 qualifier, they defeated Chile and Barbados and lost to Zimbabwe in the group phase. Next they defeated Uruguay to reach semifinal, where they were beaten by Japan.

Core status 2015
Russia returned to the Sevens World Series qualifier at the 2015 Hong Kong Sevens, where they defeated South Korea and Tunisia and lost to Papua New Guinea in the group phase. Later they defeated Hong Kong, Papua New Guinea and Zimbabwe to win the tournament and claim core status for the 2015-16 Sevens World Series. In the 2015-16 Series, Russia finished second last and managed to maintain core status, ahead of last-placed Portugal who were relegated.

Players

Current squad
Squad current through 8 July 2017

Denis Simplikevich
Ramil Gaysin
Alexey Kapalin
German Davydov
Vladislav Sozonov
Vitaly Zhivatov
Vladislav Lazarenko
Dmitry Perov
Ivan Korotkov

Ilya Babaev
Mikhail Babaev
Kevin Akuabu
Vladimir Ostroushko
Ivan Kotov
Roman Roshchin
Patris Peki
Eduard Filatov
Yuri Gostyuzhev

Tournament history

World Cup Sevens record

Summer Olympics record

Summer Universiade record

European Sevens results

See also
 World Sevens Series
 Rugby World Cup Sevens

References

National rugby sevens teams
Sevens